Menard County is a county in the U.S. state of Illinois. According to the 2010 United States Census, it had a population of 12,705. Its county seat is Petersburg. Menard County is part of the Springfield, Illinois, IL Metropolitan Statistical Area.

History
Menard County was formed in 1839 out of Sangamon County. The County was named for Pierre Menard, the first lieutenant governor of Illinois.

Geography

Climate and weather

Major highways
  Illinois Route 29
  Illinois Route 97
  Illinois Route 123

Adjacent counties
 Mason County - north
 Logan County - east
 Sangamon County - south
 Cass County - west

Demographics

As of the 2010 United States Census, there were 12,705 people, 5,140 households, and 3,683 families living in the county. The racial makeup of the county was 97.5% white, 0.6% black or African American, 0.3% American Indian, 0.2% Asian, 0.4% from other races, and 1.1% from two or more races. Those of Hispanic or Latino origin made up 1.0% of the population. In terms of ancestry, 32.5% were German, 20.8% were American, 15.6% were Irish, and 14.3% were English.

Of the 5,140 households, 32.4% had children under the age of 18 living with them, 57.5% were married couples living together, 9.6% had a female householder with no husband present, 28.3% were non-families, and 24.3% of all households were made up of individuals. The average household size was 2.44 and the average family size was 2.87. The median age was 42.6 years.

The median income for a household in the county was $56,230 and the median income for a family was $65,882. Males had a median income of $42,408 versus $36,735 for females. The per capita income for the county was $26,281. About 6.1% of families and 7.7% of the population were below the poverty line, including 10.4% of those under age 18 and 9.4% of those age 65 or over.

Communities

Cities
 Athens
 Petersburg (seat)

Villages
 Greenview
 Oakford
 Tallula

Census-designated place
 Lake Petersburg

Other unincorporated communities

 Atterberry
 Bobtown
 Croft
 Culver
 Curtis
 Fancy Prairie
 Hill Top
 Hilltop
 Hubly
 Lewisburg
 Loyd
 Old Salem Chautauqua
 Sweet Water
 Tice

Politics and county government
Illinois counties have the option of using or rejecting the township form of providing local services. In Illinois, only 16 of the state's 102 counties have opted out of the township system; Menard County is one of the sixteen.

In the years before World War I, Menard was a German Catholic and thus Democratic county, opposed to the pietism of Yankee Protestant Northern Illinois. Theodore Roosevelt in 1904 was the only Republican to carry the county in this time span.

However, resistance against Woodrow Wilson’s participatory attitude during World War I allowed Charles Evans Hughes to carry Menard County in 1916 by a mere four votes (Hughes lost the national election). Since then, as German hostility to Wilson hardened, Menard has become a strongly Republican county. The only Democrats who have carried Menard County since 1916 have been Franklin D. Roosevelt in 1932 and 1936, and Lyndon Johnson in 1964. Excluding the landslide losses of Hoover, Landon and Goldwater, George Bush senior in 1992 is the solitary Republican candidate since 1920 to fail to win a majority in Menard County. Illinois-bred Barack Obama is the only Democrat since 1980 to reach forty percent of Menard County’s vote, but over the last two elections a strong anti-Democratic swing – common to all of rural downstate Illinois – has taken place.

See also
 National Register of Historic Places listings in Menard County IL

References

External links
  Menard County Tourism Council
  Illinois Genealogy Trails

 
Illinois counties
1839 establishments in Illinois
Populated places established in 1839
Springfield metropolitan area, Illinois